Scott Dawson may refer to:
Dax Harwood (born 1984), American professional wrestler formerly known as Scott Dawson
Scott Dawson (evangelist) (born 1967), American author and preacher
Scott Windsor, ne Scott Dawson, fictional character in Emmerdale

See also